

Predicted and scheduled events

 February 6–22 – The 2026 Winter Olympics are scheduled to be held in Milan and Cortina d'Ampezzo, Italy.
 March 6–15 – The 2026 Winter Paralympics are scheduled to be held in Milan and Cortina d'Ampezzo, Italy.
 March 17–29 – The 2026 Commonwealth Games are scheduled to be held in Victoria, Australia.
 May – The 2026 Eurovision song contest is scheduled; the location is typically determined by the previous year's winner.
 June - July 19 – The 2026 FIFA World Cup is scheduled to be held in the United States, Canada, and Mexico.

References